Stacey Bess (born October 16, 1963 in Salt Lake City, Utah) is an American author and educator, known for authoring the memoir Nobody Don't Love Nobody, which was made into a Hallmark Hall of Fame movie in 2011 called "Beyond the Blackboard."

Nobody Don't Love Nobody is the story of Bess' first teaching job, the only assignment she could find, at a school that worked with homeless children in a shelter. She was told she would be needed to teach grades K–6, but she instead taught grades K–12.

Bess has a BA in elementary education from the University of Utah. She now works as a public speaker, advocating for the educational rights of impoverished children.

Bess and her husband Greg have been married for 38 years and are the parents of six children.

Awards and honors
Her service has been recognized with a number of awards, including the National Jefferson Award for Greatest Public Service by Someone 35 Years or Younger. Other awards include: Delta Kappa Gamma Educator's Award, Rescuer of Humanity from Project Love, Distinguished Woman of the Year from the American Association of University Women.

References

External links 
 L.A. Times article
 StacyBess.com
 Stacey Bess BS'87
 Shelter in the Heart

1963 births
Living people
21st-century American women writers
University of Utah alumni
20th-century American educators
21st-century American writers
Writers from Salt Lake City
Educators from Utah
20th-century American women educators